Pulitzer's longbill (Macrosphenus pulitzeri) is a species of bird. Formerly considered an "Old World warbler" and placed in the family Sylviidae, it is now considered to belong to a group of enigmatic African warblers in the family Macrosphenidae. It is found only in Angola.

Its natural habitat is subtropical or tropical dry forests. It is threatened by habitat loss.

References

Pulitzer's longbill
Endemic birds of Angola
Pulitzer's longbill
Taxonomy articles created by Polbot